Sein Nae Tay Zar is a 1983 Burmese black-and-white drama film, directed by Myo Myint Aung starring Kyaw Hein, San Shar Tin and Swe Zin Htaik. The film is a sequel to Tay Zar.

Cast
Kyaw Hein as Tay Zar
Swe Zin Htaik as Sein
San Shar Tin as Daw Tin Tin
May Nwet as Daw Htway
Myint Naing as Ba Kyi
Eant Kyaw as Yin Maung
Zaw Htoo as Soe Tint
Khin Nu Nu as Mya Yee
Kay Thwe Moe as Too Mar
Phyu Mar as Pu Sue Ma
Han Saw as Nga Soe Lay

Award

References

1983 films
1980s Burmese-language films
Films shot in Myanmar
Burmese black-and-white films
1983 drama films